Vitamins & Crash Helmets Tour - Greatest Hits Live is the first live album by heavy metal band Dangerous Toys. It was released in 1999.

Track listing 
"Outlaw" - 3:46
"Take Me Drunk" - 3:59
"Queen of the Nile" - 3:34
"Bones in the Gutter" - 3:25
"Sport'n a Woody" - 3:23
"Scared" - 4:17
"Teas'n Pleas'n" - 5:01
"Best of Friends" - 5:28
"Angel N. U." - 5:10
"Ten Boots" - 3:07
"Line 'Em Up" - 3:01
"Gimme No Lip" - 3:19
"Gunfighter for Love" - 3:52
"Promise the Moon" - 3:56
"Pissed" - 3:52
"Share the Kill" - 3:22
"Transmission" - 5:33
"Dangerous Toys" - 5:03

All songs by Dangerous Toys.

Personnel
Jason McMaster: vocals
Scott Dalhover: guitar
Mike Watson: bass, backing vocals
Paul Lidel: guitar, slide guitar, backing vocals
Mark Geary: drums

References

Dangerous Toys albums
1999 live albums
Cleopatra Records live albums